Emil Willer (born 1 September 1932) is a German boxer. He competed in the men's light heavyweight event at the 1960 Summer Olympics. At the 1960 Summer Olympics, he lost to Zbigniew Pietrzykowski of Poland.

References

1932 births
Living people
German male boxers
Olympic boxers of the United Team of Germany
Boxers at the 1960 Summer Olympics
Sportspeople from Kiel
Light-heavyweight boxers